Engin Güngör (born 17 May 1986 in Nijmegen) is a Turkish footballer. He currently plays for Kırklarelispor.

References 

1986 births
Living people
Dutch people of Turkish descent
Association football midfielders
Turkish footballers
Turkish expatriate footballers
Turkey youth international footballers
Süper Lig players
FC Eindhoven players
Hacettepe S.K. footballers
Kastamonuspor footballers
Gaziosmanpaşaspor footballers
Altınordu F.K. players
Ankara Keçiörengücü S.K. footballers
Tarsus Idman Yurdu footballers
Kırklarelispor footballers